Lawn bowls at the 2022 Commonwealth Games – Women's triples was held at the Victoria Park from 2 to 5 August. A total of 51 athletes from 17 associations participated in the event.

Sectional play
The top two triples from each section will advance to the knockout stage.

Section A

Section B

Section C

Section D

Knockout stage

External links
Results

References

Women's triples